This table displays the top-rated primetime television series of the 1952–53 season as measured by Nielsen Media Research.

References

1952 in American television
1953 in American television
1952-related lists
1953-related lists
Lists of American television series